Slightly Pimpish/Mostly Doggish is the fifth studio album and eighth album overall released by N2Deep.  Although this album was released under the name N2Deep it is actually a Jay Tee solo album as TL does not participate on this project. The album was released in 2000 for Swerve Records and was produced by Jay Tee, Philly Blunt and Ken Franklin. Latino Velvet (a rap group consisting of Jay Tee, Frost, Baby Beesh and Don Cisco), PSD and Mac Dre all make guest appearances on this album.

Track listing
"Intro"- :54  
"I Am"   4:26  
"Act a Fool" (featuring Mac Dre & PSD)- 3:16  
"Turn It into Somethin'"- 4:22  
"Ride Greyhound"- :34  
"Playa 4 Life"- 4:39  
"Congratulations" (featuring Baby Beesh & Merciless)- 3:13  
"Back'n Tha Day"- 3:26  
"Howda"- 4:13  
"Perro"- 4:14  
"Summertime in the City" (featuring ODM)- 3:46  
"Game Tight" (featuring Young Dru)- 4:04  
"Maria" (featuring Latino Velvet)- 3:40  
"Little Bit of Head" (featuring Kripto)- 3:56  
"Get High" (featuring Young Dru & Young Neen)- 4:11    
"I'm from Vallejo Playa" (produced and engineered by Dave Fore)- 4:06

N2Deep albums
Jay Tee albums
2000 albums